Skrolsvik Chapell is a parish church of the Church of Norway in Senja Municipality in Troms og Finnmark county, Norway. It is located in the village of Skrollsvika on the southwest coast of the island of Senja. It is an annex chapel for the Tranøy parish which is part of the Senja prosti (deanery) in the Diocese of Nord-Hålogaland. The white, wooden church was built in a long church style in 1924. The church seats about 170 people.

See also
List of churches in Nord-Hålogaland

References

Senja
Churches in Troms
Wooden churches in Norway
20th-century Church of Norway church buildings
Churches completed in 1924
1924 establishments in Norway
Long churches in Norway